William Bagonza (12 November 1960 – 9 December 2000) was a Ugandan boxer. He competed in the men's light flyweight event at the 1984 Summer Olympics.

References

1960 births
2000 deaths
Ugandan male boxers
Olympic boxers of Uganda
Boxers at the 1984 Summer Olympics
Place of birth missing
Light-flyweight boxers